The 2013-14 season was the 127th season of Cheltenham Town's existence, and their fourteenth in the Football League since promotion from Conference National in 2000.

League Two

League table

Results by matchday

Matches

The fixtures for the 2014–15 season were announced on 18 June 2014 at 9am.

FA Cup

Football League Cup

Football League Trophy

Transfers and loans

In

Out

Loan In

Loan out

References

Cheltenham Town
Cheltenham Town F.C. seasons